Michael "Mike" Rosenauer (born July 13, 1966) is a former professional German darts player who has played in the Professional Darts Corporation (PDC) events.

Career

Rosenauer created controversy when he chose to play in the 2008 PDC World Darts Championship, having won qualification for the 2008 BDO World Darts Championship. Rosenauer claimed one of the places for the event at the Lakeside, but at the same time, he topped the German Darts Corporation Order of Merit, which grants a place in the PDC World Championship and in the end, he withdrew from the BDO World Championship to play in the PDC version instead. He went on to lose in the first round to Mervyn King.

In 2012, Rosenauer earned a place in the European Tour Event 1 in Vienna by defeating Alexander Tauber and Tomas Seyler in the European qualifier. He played Richie Burnett in the first round and lost 4–6. Rosenauer also qualified for the second European Tour event in June, with wins over Karsten Kornath and Jyhan Artut in the Home Nation Qualifier. He beat world number 8 Andy Hamilton in the first round 6–4, before losing to Dave Chisnall 1–6 in round two. Rosenauer lost to Ronnie Baxter 1–6 in the first round of the 2012 European Championship. In an attempt to reach the 2013 World Championship, Rosenauer was defeated 5–6 by Dragutin Horvat in the quarter-finals of the Central European Qualifier. Rosenauer was ranked world number 78 after the event, outside of the top 64 who retain their tour cards for 2013.

In the next two years Rosenauer curtailed his darts schedule and only competed in European Tour events. In 2014 he qualified for the European Darts Open, European Darts Grand Prix and European Darts Trophy, losing in the second round of the first two and the opening round of the latter. He did attempt to qualify for the 2015 UK Open but could not win enough games. Rosenauer qualified for the European Darts Open, but lost 6–5 to Jamie Lewis in the first round.

World Championship results

PDC

 2008: Last 64 (lost to Mervyn King 2–3) (sets)

References

External links
Profile and stats on Darts Database

1966 births
German darts players
Living people
People from Gütersloh
Sportspeople from Detmold (region)
Professional Darts Corporation former tour card holders
British Darts Organisation players